Charles Towneley (1803 – 4 November 1870) was an Irish Independent Irish Party and Whig politician.

He married Lady Caroline Molyneux, the daughter of William Molyneux, 2nd Earl of Sefton in 1836 and had three daughters : Alice, the second wife of Thomas O'Hagan, 1st Baron O'Hagan, Emily, who married Lord Alexander Gordon-Lennox, and Caroline, who married Montagu Bertie, 7th Earl of Abingdon. Elected as a fellow of the Royal Society of London in 1842. Held the Lordship of Bowland from 1846 to 1876, and was High Sheriff of Lancashire in 1857; also JP, DL, and FSA.

Towneley was first elected Whig MP for Sligo Borough at a by-election in April 1848. However, after a committee formed due to an election petition found he was, by his agents, guilty of treating, he was declared unelected in June, causing a by-election in July. He returned to the seat as an Independent Irish MP after the 1852 general election but, in 1853, again was unseated. Upon another petition, bribery by his agents was again discovered. He made no further bids for parliament afterwards

Towneley was commissioned on 16 March 1853 to raise the 5th Royal Lancashire Militia with the rank of Lieutenant-Colonel Commandant. He retired from the command on 23 March 1863 and was appointed Honorary Colonel of the regiment. 

His horse Kettledrum won the 1861 Epsom Derby, He (and possibly others) used the winnings to build St Hubert's catholic church in Dunsop Bridge.

References

Sources

External links
 

1803 births
1870 deaths
Irish Nationalist politicians
Whig (British political party) MPs for Irish constituencies
Members of the Parliament of the United Kingdom for County Sligo constituencies (1801–1922)
UK MPs 1847–1852
UK MPs 1852–1857
Lancashire Militia officers